The Darkest Powers is a series of paranormal novels by Kelley Armstrong. The series revolves around The Edison Group, a team of supernatural scientists, and the subjects they have experimented on. The novels are divided into two trilogies. The Summoning, The Awakening, and The Reckoning comprise The Darkest Powers trilogy, which follows fifteen-year-old necromancer Chloe Saunders. The Gathering, The Calling, and The Rising comprise The Darkness Rising trilogy, which follows a sixteen-year-old girl named Maya Delaney.

Darkest Powers series

The Darkest Powers trilogy

The Darkness Rising trilogy

The Darkest Powers short stories

Dangerous, Divided and Disenchanted are no longer available in the Edison Archives.  In late September 2011, they will be released as a "Darkest Powers bonus pack." This will be available via eBook.

Chronological Order of the Darkest Powers Series

Dangerous
Kat
The Summoning
Divided
The Awakening
Disenchanted
The Reckoning
Facing Facts 
Hunting Kat
Belonging http://www.darkestpowers.com/2011/05/
The Gathering
The Calling
 The Rising
Atoning http://www.kelleyarmstrong.com/free-online-fiction/

See also
Women of the Otherworld - Another Series by Kelley Armstrong

References

www.kelleyarmstrong.com/books
www.darkestpowers.com

External links
 Official Website
 Kelley Armstrong
 Edison Group

Fantasy novel series
Horror novel series
Paranormal romance novel series
Novels by Kelley Armstrong
HarperCollins books